Richard John Tait (January 17, 1964 – July 25, 2022) was a Scottish-born American board game creator.

Biography
Born in Scotland, Tait attended Heriot-Watt University, where he studied computer science. Later, he moved to the United States and joined Tuck School of Business for his master's degree.

After his graduation from Tuck School, he joined Microsoft as a software developer. During his tenure, he hired Satya Nadella, the current CEO of Microsoft. He left Microsoft in 1997.

In 1998, Tait co-created a board game, Cranium.

Tait died from complications of COVID-19 on July 25, 2022, at his home in Bainbridge Island, Washington. He was 58.

References

1964 births
2022 deaths
Scottish emigrants to the United States
Board game designers
Alumni of Heriot-Watt University
Deaths from the COVID-19 pandemic in Washington (state)